KLUF may refer to:

 KLUF-LD, a low-power television station (channel 27, virtual 5) licensed to Lufkin, Texas, United States
 the ICAO code for Luke Air Force Base, in Glendale, Arizona, United States